York City Football Club is a professional association football club based in York, North Yorkshire, England. Founded in 1922, the club was elected to play in the Midland League, and competed in this league for seven seasons before being elected to the Football League as members of the Third Division North in 1929. York reached the second tier of English football with promotion to the Second Division in 1974, but were relegated two years later. York became the first team to reach 100 points in a Football League season after winning the 1983–84 Fourth Division championship with 101 points, which remains to be the club's only league title. The club was relegated to the Football Conference following the 2003–04 season, but returned to the Football League with victory in the 2012 Conference Premier play-off Final.

The York City Clubman of the Year award is voted for annually by the club's supporters to name a player who throughout the season has met the three criteria of sportsmanship, effort on the field of play and ability. Previously fans voted by either handing a voting form to the club or by e-mailing the club and can now vote via an online poll. As a mark of respect, the trophy is named the Billy Fenton Memorial Trophy, after player Billy Fenton, who died suddenly in 1973. The award is presented before the final home match of the season, for many years by Fenton's widow, Margot Fenton. However, the presentation of the award took place at an awards night in 2011, while the following year it was presented after the final home game of the season. From 2014 to 2015, an awards night was held at York Racecourse to present the award. In 2016, the award was presented before the final home match of the season.

Since the inaugural award was made to Phil Burrows in 1974, 38 different players have won the award. Eight of these players have won the award for at least a second time, the most recent being Sean Newton. Newton and Daniel Parslow are the only players to have received the award on three occasions. Gordon Staniforth was the first to win the trophy in consecutive seasons, a feat since emulated by John MacPhail, Barry Jones and Alan Fettis. Three winners of the award have represented their country at senior international level, of whom Jon McCarthy and Alan Fettis went on to become Clubman of the Year for a second time. Chris Brass, the winner of the 2003 award, went on to manage the club from 2003 to 2004. The current incumbent of the award is Peter Jameson, who was the 2021–22 recipient.

Key
 denotes a divisional change due to promotion or relegation.
 denotes a player registered with York City in the 2021–22 season.
Player (X) denotes the number of times a player has won the award.

Winners

Wins by playing position

Wins by nationality

Notes

References
General

Specific

Clubman of the Year
York City Clubman of the Year
York City F.C. Clubman of the Year
Association football player non-biographical articles